Heaven's Postman, also known as Postman to Heaven is a 2009 South Korean-Japanese film starring Kim Jaejoong and Han Hyo-joo. A young CEO quits his job and becomes a kind of supernatural postman, delivering letters from grieving families and loved ones to the dead in heaven.

It was part of the "Telecinema7" project, seven feature-length mini-dramas which were collaborations between South Korean TV directors and Japanese TV screenwriters; the seven Korea-Japan joint productions both received a limited theater release and were broadcast on television. Heaven's Postman was first released in Korea in CGV theaters on November 11, 2009, and in Japanese cinemas on May 29, 2010. It later aired on SBS (South Korea) on September 25, 2010, and TV Asahi (Japan) in 2010.

Plot
Jae-joon used to be a promising young CEO of an IT company, until he unexpectedly becomes a postman. He delivers the letters grieving people have written to their loved ones in Heaven. One day, he comes across Hana, who writes a letter full of resentment to the dead man that she used to love, and reveals his presence to her. Jae-joon proposes that Hana delivers responses which come back from Heaven and the two think up various ways to give peace and happiness to those who are alive and left behind, sometimes by writing the responses themselves. But a human being and a postman from Heaven cannot spend unlimited time together. As they start to grow feelings for each other, Jae-joon tries to pull himself away from Hana and the two, for the last time, deliver a response to an owner of a coffeehouse who had been agonizing for a long time over the loss of his son.

Cast
Kim Jae-joong as Shin Jae-joon / Yuu
Han Hyo-joo as Jo Hana / Saki
Shin Goo as Choi Geun-bae
Kim Chang-wan as Lee Moon-gyo
Yook Mi-ra as Moon-gyo's wife
Joo Jin-mo as Yoon Jeon-soo
Lee Doo-il as Goo Dae-bong
Jang Jung-hee as Woo-sub's mother

See also
The Relation of Face, Mind and Love
19-Nineteen
Triangle
Paradise
After the Banquet
A Dream Comes True

References

External links
 https://web.archive.org/web/20130624215141/http://telecinema7.jp/ 
 http://cafe.naver.com/telecine7/ 
 https://web.archive.org/web/20130421050804/http://www.tv-asahi.co.jp/nikkandrama/ 
 
 
 

2000s Korean-language films
Japanese romantic fantasy films
South Korean romantic fantasy films
2009 films
2000s romantic fantasy films
2000s Japanese films
2000s South Korean films